was a Japanese naval officer and educator.

Career
A native of Fukuoka Prefecture, Matsushita graduated from the 31st class of the Imperial Japanese Naval Academy in 1903. He was assigned to serve on the cruiser  during the early stages of the Russo-Japanese War of 1904-1905, and was on the cruiser  during the decisive Battle of Tsushima. After the end of the war, he served on the cruiser  from November 1905 to October 1906. After graduation from the Naval Artillery School, he returned to Yakumo as a lieutenant. He was subsequently Chief of staff to the IJN 1st Fleet. In May 1914, he graduated from the 12th class of the Navy Staff College as a lieutenant commander. After a posting as gunnery officer on the cruiser , he was sent to London in October 1917 as a military attache. Matsushita was promoted to commander while in London, and after his return in December 1919, was assigned to the staff of the IJN 4th Fleet.

In January 1921, Matsushita served as chief secretary to Minister of the Navy Admiral Katō Tomosaburō. In December 1922, he was promoted to captain, and given his first command, that of the cruiser . After a posting to the Naval Personnel Bureau, he returned to sea as captain of the battleship  in December 1925. Matsushita was promoted to rear admiral in December 1927.

As Commandant of the Imperial Japanese Naval Academy in the early-1930s, Matsuhita is credited with devising the Gosei or "Five Reflections".  These words became traditional precepts of cadets at the Imperial Japanese Naval Academy. Every evening cadets were expected to meditate on these inter-related questions.  The Japan Maritime Self Defense Force (JMSDF) continues to use of the Gosei as a self-reflective exercise. Matsushita was promoted to vice admiral in December 1932. He subsequently served as Commander in Chief of the Training Fleet from October 1933, Commander of the Maizuru Naval District from November 1934, and Commander of the Sasebo Naval District from March 1936 before retiring in March 1937.

Notes

References
 Kennedy, Maxwell Taylor. (2009). Danger's Hour: The Story of the USS Bunker Hill and the Kamikaze Pilot Who Crippled Her. New York: Simon and Schuster. ; 
 Smith, Peter C. (2006). Fist from the Sky: Japan's Dive-Bomber Ace of World War II.  Mechanicsburg, Pennsylvania: Stackpole. ;

External links

1884 births
1953 deaths
Military personnel from Fukuoka Prefecture
Imperial Japanese Navy admirals
Japanese military personnel of the Russo-Japanese War